The PGA Tour (stylized in all capital letters as PGA TOUR by its officials) is the organizer of professional golf tours in the United States and North America. It organizes most of the events on the flagship annual series of tournaments also known as the PGA Tour, as well as PGA Tour Champions (age 50 and older) and the Korn Ferry Tour (for professional players who have not yet qualified to play on the PGA Tour), as well as PGA Tour Canada, PGA Tour Latinoamérica, and PGA Tour China. The PGA Tour is a nonprofit organization headquartered in Ponte Vedra Beach, Florida, a suburb southeast of Jacksonville. Originally established by the Professional Golfers' Association of America, it was spun off in December 1968 into a separate organization for tour players, as opposed to club professionals, the focal members of today's PGA of America. Originally the "Tournament Players Division", it adopted the name "PGA Tour" in 1975 and runs most of the week-to-week professional golf events on the tournament known as the PGA Tour, including The Players Championship, hosted at TPC Sawgrass; the FedEx Cup, with its finale at The Tour Championship at East Lake Golf Club; and the biennial Presidents Cup. The remaining events on the PGA Tour are run by different organizations, as are the U.S.-based LPGA Tour for women and other men's and women's professional tours around the world.

History
The roots of the modern PGA Tour stretch back to April 10, 1916, when the Professional Golfers' Association of America was formed. The modern tour recognizes wins from this era as "PGA Tour" victories despite the formal founding of the tour as a separate entity coming much later.

By 1916, several prestigious golf tournaments offering prize money to the winner had been established in America, including the North and South Open, the Metropolitan Open, the Shawnee Open, the Western Open and the national championship, the U.S. Open. They formed the initial schedule of what came to be known much later as the "PGA Tour", with the addition of the PGA Championship in 1916. The Open Championship in the UK, the oldest golf tournament in the world founded in 1860, would become a PGA Tour event much later in 1995. All Open Championship wins dating back to 1860 were retroactively recognized as PGA Tour victories in 2002.

Throughout the 1920s and 1930s, various state open tournaments began, many organized by sections of the PGA. Tournaments recognized as PGA Tour wins from this era include the California Open, Connecticut Open, Florida Open, Maryland Open, Massachusetts Open, New Jersey State Open, New York State Open, Ohio Open, Oklahoma Open, Oregon Open, Pennsylvania Open Championship, Utah Open, Virginia Open and the Wisconsin State Open. This legacy lives on with the modern PGA Tour as the Valero Texas Open dates back to this era of state opens on the tour.

The tour, then known informally as "The Circuit" for professional golfers in the PGA, became more formalized in 1929. A tournament committee was formed, consisting of Tommy Armour, Al Espinosa and J.J. Patterson. In 1930, Bob Harlow was hired as manager of the PGA Tournament Bureau and worked to formalize a year-round schedule of tournaments.

With an increase of revenue in the late 1960s due to expanded television coverage, a dispute arose between the touring professionals and the PGA of America on how to distribute the windfall. The tour players wanted larger purses, where the PGA desired the money to go to the general fund to help grow the game at the local level. Following the final major in July 1968 at the PGA Championship, several leading tour pros voiced their dissatisfaction with the venue and the abundance of club pros in the field. The increased friction resulted in a new entity in August, what would eventually become the PGA Tour. Tournament players formed their own organization, American Professional Golfers, Inc. (APG), independent of the PGA of America. Its headquarters were in New York City.

After several months, a compromise was reached in December: the tour players agreed to abolish the APG and form the PGA "Tournament Players Division", a fully autonomous division under the supervision of a new 10-member Tournament Policy Board. The board consisted of four tour players, three PGA of America executives, and three outside members, initially business executives.

Joseph Dey, the recently retired USGA executive director, was selected by the board as the tour's first commissioner in January 1969 and agreed to a five-year contract. He was succeeded by tour player Deane Beman in early 1974, who served for twenty years. The name officially changed to the "PGA Tour" in 1975. In 1978 the PGA Tour "removed its restrictions on women." However, no women have joined the tour since this date.

In late August 1981, the PGA Tour had a marketing dispute with the PGA of America and officially changed its name to the TPA Tour, for the "Tournament Players Association". The disputed issues were resolved within seven months and the tour's name was changed back to the "PGA Tour" in March 1982.

Tim Finchem became the third commissioner in June 1994 and continued for over 22 years; on January 1, 2017, he was succeeded by Jay Monahan.

Without the tour players, the PGA of America became primarily an association of club professionals, but retained control of two significant events; the PGA Championship and the Ryder Cup. The former was an established major championship, but the latter was an obscure match play team event which was not particularly popular with golf fans, due to predictable dominance by the United States. With the addition of players from continental Europe in 1979 and expanded television coverage, it became very competitive and evolved into the premier international team event, lately dominated by Europe. Both events are very important revenue streams for the PGA of America.

In June 2022, the PGA Tour suspended seventeen players who played in the inaugural LIV Golf Invitational Series event. Monahan wrote in a memo to the tour's membership that any players that take part in future LIV Golf events will be subjected to the same punishment. PGA Tour members that joined LIV Golf included major champions Brooks Koepka, Bryson DeChambeau, Patrick Reed, Dustin Johnson, and Phil Mickelson. 

On July 11, 2022, it was reported that the US Department of Justice was investigating the PGA Tour to determine if they engaged in anti-competitive behavior with LIV Golf. In late 2021, the PGA Tour began speaking with White House officials and congress members to express concerns over LIV Golf. The tour has paid over $400,000 to the firm DLA Piper to lobby lawmakers on their behalf for various topics including LIV Golf proposals. The tour had previously been investigated in the early 1990s but despite tour policies having been found to be in violation of antitrust laws, no further action was taken.

In August 2022, eleven players who had joined LIV Golf filed an antitrust lawsuit against the PGA Tour to challenge their suspensions. Three players failed to obtain a temporary restraining order to allow them to participate in the FedEx Cup playoffs. Trial for the main case was scheduled to begin in September 2023.

Tours operated by the PGA Tour
The PGA Tour does not run any of the four major championships (Masters, PGA Championship, U.S. Open, The Open), or the Ryder Cup. The PGA of America, not the PGA Tour, runs the PGA Championship and the Senior PGA Championship, and co-organizes the Ryder Cup with Ryder Cup Europe, a company controlled by the PGA European Tour. Additionally, the PGA Tour is not involved with the women's golf tours in the U.S., which are mostly controlled by the LPGA. The PGA Tour is also not the governing body for the game of golf in the United States; this, instead, is the role of the United States Golf Association (USGA), which organizes the U.S. Open. What the PGA Tour does organize are the remaining 43 (in 2009) week-to-week events, including The Players Championship and the FedEx Cup events, as well as the biennial Presidents Cup. It also runs the main tournaments on five other tours: PGA Tour Champions, the Korn Ferry Tour (formerly known as Web.com Tour), PGA Tour Canada, PGA Tour China, and PGA Tour Latinoamérica.

The PGA Tour operates six tours. Three of them are primarily contested in the U.S., and the other three are international developmental tours centered on a specific country or region.

PGA Tour, the top tour.
Some events take place outside the United States: Canada, South Korea, Japan, the United Kingdom, the Dominican Republic, Bermuda and the U.S. possession of Puerto Rico host one sole-sanctioned event each year; Mexico hosts two. The events in Puerto Rico, Bermuda and the Dominican Republic are alternate events held opposite World Golf Championships tournaments and therefore have weaker fields than regular Tour events. In addition, China hosts a World Golf Championships event and the United Kingdom hosts a major championship.
PGA Tour Champions, for golfers age 50 and over
 As of 2016, one regular tournament is held in Canada, and one of the senior majors is held in the UK, the rest in the US.
Korn Ferry Tour, a US developmental tour.
 As of 2014, Colombia, Panama, Chile, Brazil, Mexico, and Canada host one tournament each.
PGA Tour Latinoamérica, an international developmental tour
 As of 2014, nine Latin American countries host tournaments.
PGA Tour Canada, another international developmental tour
 Historically known as the "Canadian Tour", it was taken over by the PGA Tour in November 2012. The 2013 season, the first under PGA Tour operation, began with a qualifying school in California, followed by nine tournaments in Canada.
PGA Tour China, also an international developmental tour
 Launched in 2014, it is independent of the former China Tour, which folded after its 2009 season.

The PGA Tour also conducts an annual Qualifying Tournament, known colloquially as "Q-School" and held over six rounds each fall. Before 2013, the official name of the tournament was the PGA Tour Qualifying Tournament; it is now officially the Korn Ferry Tour Qualifying Tournament. Through the 2012 edition, the top-25 finishers, including ties, received privileges to play on the following year's PGA Tour. Remaining finishers in the top 75, plus ties, received full privileges on the Korn Ferry Tour. Since 2013, all competitors who made the final phase of Q-School earned status on the Korn Ferry Tour at the start of the following season, with high finishers receiving additional rights as follows:
 Golfers who finish 11th through 45th (including ties) are exempt until the second "reshuffle" of the following season (first eight events).
 On the Korn Ferry Tour, a "reshuffle" refers to a reordering of the tour's eligibility list, which determines the players who can enter tournaments. After four tournaments, and every fourth tournament thereafter until the Korn Ferry Tour Finals, players are re-ranked according to their tour earnings on the season. However, the ranking position of players who are exempt from a "reshuffle" does not change.
 Those who finish 2nd through 10th (including ties) are exempt until the third reshuffle of the following season (first 12 events).
 The medalist (top finisher) has full playing privileges for the entire regular season, which carries with it automatic entry to the Tour Finals.

Since 2013, 50 Korn Ferry Tour golfers earn privileges during the next PGA Tour season, which now begins the month after the Tour Finals. The top 25 money winners over the regular season (i.e., before the Tour Finals) receive PGA Tour cards, as do the top 25 money winners in the Finals. The priority position of all 50 golfers on the PGA Tour is based on money earned during the Tour Finals, except that the regular season money leader shares equal status with the Finals money leader. In addition, a golfer who wins three events on that tour in a calendar year earns a "performance promotion" (informally a "battlefield promotion") which garners PGA Tour privileges for the remainder of the year plus the following full season.

At the end of each year, the top 125 in FedEx Cup points (top 125 on the money list before 2013) receive a tour card for the following season, which gives them exemption from qualifying for most of the next year's tournaments. However, at some events, known as invitationals, exemptions apply only to the previous year's top 70 players. Since 2013, players who are ranked between 126 and 200 in FedEx Cup points (and are not already exempt by other means) are eligible for entry in the Korn Ferry Tour Finals, where they can regain their PGA Tour privileges. Non-exempt players who finish 126th–150th in the FedEx Cup but fail to regain their PGA Tour cards are given conditional PGA Tour status for the season and are fully exempt on the Korn Ferry Tour.

Winning a PGA Tour event provides a tour card for a minimum of two years, with an extra year added for each additional win with a maximum of five years. Winning a World Golf Championships event, The Tour Championship, the Arnold Palmer Invitational, or the Memorial Tournament provides a three-year exemption. Winners of the major championships, The Players Championship, and the FedEx Cup earn a five-year exemption. Other types of exemptions include lifetime exemptions for players with twenty wins on the tour; one-time, one-year exemptions for players in the top fifty on the career money earnings list who are not otherwise exempt; two-time, one-year exemptions for players in the top twenty-five on the career money list; and medical exemptions for players who have been injured or are going through a family crisis, which give them an opportunity to regain their tour card after a period out of the tour. In 2015, the PGA Tour added a clause which would freeze an exemption for those required to perform military service in their native countries in response to South Korea's Bae Sang-moon having to leave the Tour for that reason.  Once a player wins a PGA Tour event, he will have at minimum past champion status should he fail to retain PGA Tour privileges.

Non-members can play their way into the PGA Tour by finishing the equivalent or better of 125th in FedEx Cup points. Those who fail but fall within the top 200 in current season points are eligible for the Korn Ferry Tour Finals. During the season, non-members can earn Special Temporary Member status by exceeding the equivalent of 150th in the previous season's FedEx Cup. Special Temporary Members receive unlimited sponsor exemptions, while non-members are limited to seven per season and twelve total events.

Similar to other major league sports, there is no rule that limits PGA Tour players to "men only". In 1938, Babe Zaharias became the first woman to compete in a PGA Tour event. In 1945, Zaharias became the first and only woman to make a cut in a PGA Tour event. In 2003, Annika Sörenstam and Suzy Whaley played in PGA Tour events, and Michelle Wie did so in each year from 2004 through 2008. In 2011, Isabelle Beisiegel became the first woman to earn a Tour card on a "men's" professional golf tour, the Canadian Tour, now PGA Tour Canada.

The LPGA Tour like all other women's sports, is limited to female participants only, except for mixed tournaments.

An organization called the PGA European Tour, separate from both the PGA Tour and the PGA of America, runs a tour, mostly in Europe, but with events throughout the world outside of North America. Several other regional tours are around the world. However, the PGA Tour, European Tour, and many of the regional tours co-sponsor the World Golf Championships. These, along with the major championships, usually count toward the official money lists of each tour as well as the Official World Golf Ranking.

Charity fundraising
The PGA Tour places a strong emphasis on charity fundraising, usually on behalf of local charities in cities where events are staged. With the exception of a few older events, PGA Tour rules require all Tour events to be non-profit; the Tour itself is also a non-profit company. In 2005, it started a campaign to push its all-time fundraising tally past one billion dollars ("Drive to a Billion"), and it reached that mark one week before the end of the season. However, monies raised for charities derive from the tournaments' positive revenues (if any), and not any actual monetary donation from the PGA Tour, whose purse monies and expenses are guaranteed. The number of charities which receive benefits from PGA Tour, PGA Tour Champions and Korn Ferry Tour events is estimated at over 2,000. In 2009, the total raised for charity was some $108 million. The organization announced to have generated $180 million for charities in 2017 through the tournaments of its six tours.

Media coverage

Domestic 
The PGA Tour's broadcast television rights are held by CBS Sports and NBC Sports, under contracts most recently renewed in 2020 to last through 2030. While it considered invoking an option to opt out of its broadcast television contracts in 2017, the PGA Tour ultimately decided against doing so. Golf Channel (which, since the acquisition of NBC Universal by Golf Channel owner Comcast, is a division of NBC Sports) has served as the pay television rightsholder of the PGA Tour since 2007. Under the contracts, CBS broadcasts weekend coverage for an average of 20 events per-season, and NBC broadcasts weekend coverage for an average of 10 events per-season. Golf Channel broadcasts early-round and weekend morning coverage of all events, as well as weekend coverage of events not broadcast on terrestrial television, and primetime encores of all events.

On March 9, 2020, the PGA Tour announced that it had reached an agreement to renew its contracts with CBS and NBC, which expired after the 2020–21 season, through 2030, maintaining most of the existing broadcast arrangements. A notable change in production under the new contract is that the PGA Tour now controls the on-site production and infrastructure for all media partners, although each individual broadcaster continues to employ their own on-air talent and personnel.

Tournaments typically featured in NBC's package include marquee events such as The Players Championship, the final three tournaments of the FedEx Cup Playoffs, and the biennial Presidents Cup event. The 2011 contract granted more extensive digital rights, as well as the ability for NBC to broadcast supplemental coverage of events on Golf Channel during its broadcast windows.  Beginning in 2022, coverage of the final three FedEx Cup playoff tournaments will begin alternating annually between CBS and NBC, rather than having them exclusive to NBC.

The PGA Tour operates a streaming service known as PGA Tour Live, which carries early-round coverage of events preceding Golf Channel television coverage, including featured groups. The service is offered as a subscription basis; until 2019, it was operated by BAMTech (formerly MLB Advanced Media), and for a period, was also carried as part of ESPN+. From 2019 to 2021, it has been operated under NBC Sports' subscription streaming platform NBC Sports Gold, adding featured holes coverage during Golf Channel's windows. Since 2017, following a pilot at the end of the 2016 season, portions of the PGA Tour Live coverage are also carried for free via the PGA Tour's Twitter account. Under the 2022–2030 contract, the service moved back to ESPN+.

In 2005, the PGA Tour reached a deal with XM Satellite Radio to co-produce a channel, the PGA Tour Network (now Sirius XM PGA Tour Radio), featuring event coverage, and talk programming relating to golf (which, since 2013, has also included audio simulcasts of selected Golf Channel programs). Its contract with Sirius XM was renewed through 2021.

International 
The PGA Tour is also covered extensively outside the United States. In the United Kingdom, Sky Sports was the main broadcaster of the tour for a number of years up to 2006. Setanta Sports won exclusive UK and Ireland rights for six years from 2007 for a reported cost of £103 million. The deal includes Champions Tour and the Nationwide Tour events, but like the U.S. television deals it does not include the major championships, and unlike the U.S. deal, it does not include the World Golf Championships. Setanta set up the Setanta Golf channel to present its coverage. On June 23, 2009, Setanta's UK arm went into administration and ceased broadcasting. Eurosport picked up the television rights for the remainder of the 2009 season. Sky Sports regained the TV rights with an eight-year deal from 2010 to 2017. In South Korea, SBS, which has been the tour's exclusive TV broadcaster in that country since the mid-1990s, agreed in 2009 to extend its contract with the PGA Tour through 2019. As a part of that deal, it became sponsor of the season's opening tournament, a winners-only event that was renamed the SBS Championship effective in 2010. In 2011 however, Korean automobile manufacturer Hyundai took over the title sponsorship, but SBS still remains a sponsor of the event.

In June 2018, it was announced that Eurosport's parent company Discovery Inc. had acquired exclusive international media rights to the PGA Tour outside of the United States, beginning 2019, under a 12-year, US$2 billion deal. The contract covers Discovery's international channels (including Eurosport), sub-licensing arrangements with local broadcasters, and development of an international PGA Tour over the top subscription service—which was unveiled in October under the brand GolfTV. The service will replace PGA Tour Live in international markets as existing rights lapse, beginning with Australia, Canada, Italy, Japan, the Netherlands, Portugal, Russia and Spain in January 2019. GolfTV also acquired rights to the Ryder Cup and European Tour in selected markets, and signed a deal with Tiger Woods to develop original content centered upon him.

Structure of the PGA Tour season

Outline of the season (2007–2013)
Three of the four majors take place in eight weeks between June and August. In the past, this has threatened to make the last  months of the season anticlimactic, as some of the very top players competed less from that point on. In response, the PGA Tour has introduced a new format, the FedEx Cup. From January through mid-August players compete in "regular season" events and earn FedEx Cup points, in addition to prize money. At the end of the regular season, the top 125 FedEx Cup points winners are eligible to compete in the "playoffs", four events taking place from mid-August to mid-September. The field sizes for these events are reduced from 125 to 100 to 70 and finally the traditional 30 for the Tour Championship. Additional FedEx Cup points are earned in these events. At the end of the championship, the top point winner is the season champion. To put this new system into place, the PGA Tour has made significant changes to the traditional schedule.

In 2007, The Players Championship moved to May so as to have a marquee event in five consecutive months. The Tour Championship moved to mid-September, with an international team event (Ryder Cup or Presidents Cup) following at the end of September. The schedule was tweaked slightly in both 2008 and 2009. After the third FedEx Cup playoff event, the BMW Championship, the Tour takes a full week off. In 2008, the break came before the Ryder Cup, with the Tour Championship the week after that. In 2009, the break was followed by the Tour Championship, with the Presidents Cup taking place two weeks after that.

The Tour continues through the fall, with the focus on the scramble of the less successful players to earn enough money to retain their tour cards. A circuit known as the Fall Series, originally with seven tournaments but now with four, was introduced in 2007. In its inaugural year, its events were held in seven consecutive weeks, starting the week after the Tour Championship. As was the case for the FedEx Cup playoff schedule, the Fall Series schedule was also tweaked in 2008 and 2009. The first 2008 Fall Series event was held opposite the Ryder Cup, and the Fall Series took a week off for the Tour Championship before continuing with its remaining six events.

The Fall Series saw major changes for 2009, with one of its events moving to May and another dropping off the schedule entirely. It returned to its original start date of the week after the Tour Championship. Then, as in 2008, it took a week off, this time for the Presidents Cup. It then continued with events in three consecutive weeks, took another week off for the HSBC Champions (now elevated to World Golf Championships status), and concluded the week after that.

Most recently, the Fall Series was reduced to four events, all held after the Tour Championship, for 2011. This followed the move of the Viking Classic into the regular season as an alternate event.

2007 saw the introduction of a tournament in Mexico, an alternate event staged the same week as the WGC-Accenture Match Play Championship. A tournament in Puerto Rico was introduced in 2008 as an alternate event staged opposite the WGC-CA Championship.

Tournaments
The 2013 season, which was the last before the tour transitioned to a schedule spanning two calendar years, had 40 official-money events in 38 weeks, including three alternate events played the same week as a higher-status tournament. The other event that is considered part of the 2013 season is the biennial Presidents Cup, matching a team of golfers representing the US with an "International" team consisting of non-European players (Europeans instead play in the Ryder Cup, held in even-numbered years).

Before the transition, the Tour held a group of events known as the PGA Tour Fall Series, which provided a final opportunity for golfers to make the top 125 in season earnings and thereby retain their Tour cards. With the change to an October-to-September season, several of the former Fall Series events will now open the season. The Tour also sanctions two events in Asia during that part of the year:
 The CIMB Classic, a limited-field event held in Malaysia and the Tour's first sanctioned event in Southeast Asia. The field is limited to 40 players—the top-25 available players in the final FedEx Cup standings, the top ten available Asian players and five sponsor's exemptions, with at least one place reserved for a Malaysian player. The 2013 edition, which was part of the 2014 season, was the first as an official-money event.
 The WGC-HSBC Champions, traditionally held the week after the Malaysia tournament. Despite its elevation to World Golf Championships status in 2009, it initially was not an official-money event. Starting in 2010, if the event was won by a PGA Tour member, it counted as an official win and carried the three-year exemption of the other WGCs. Starting in 2013, the HSBC Champions became an official money event, and wins are official for Tour and non-Tour members alike.

Most members of the tour play between 20 and 30 tournaments in the season. The geography of the tour is determined by climate. It starts in Hawaii in January and spends most of its first two months in California and Arizona during what is known as the "West Coast Swing" and then moves to the American Southeast for the "Southern Swing". Each swing culminates in a significant tour event. In April, tour events begin to drift north. The summer months are spent mainly in the Northeast and the Midwest, and in the fall (autumn) the tour heads south again.

In most of the regular events on tour, the field is either 132, 144 or 156 players, depending on time of year (and available daylight hours). All players making the cut earn money for the tournament with the winner usually receiving 18% of the total purse.

In 2008, the PGA Tour Policy Board approved a change in the number of players that will make the cut. The cut will continue to be low 70 professionals and ties, unless that results in a post-cut field of more than 78 players. Under that circumstance, the cut score will be selected to make a field as close to 70 players as possible without exceeding 78. Players who are cut in such circumstances but who have placed 70th or worse will get credit for making the cut and will earn official money and FedEx Cup points. This policy affected two of the first three events with cuts, the Sony Open in Hawaii and the Buick Invitational. In late February, the Policy Board announced a revised cut policy, effective beginning with the Honda Classic. The new policy calls for 36-hole cut to the low 70 professionals and ties and, if that cut results in more than 78 players, a second 54-hole cut to the low 70 professionals and ties. Those who do not survive the 54-hole cut were designated as MDF (made the cut, did not finish). For the 2020 season, the cut line was reduced to 65 plus ties and eliminated the 54-hole cut.

In the event that the PGA Tour cannot guarantee four rounds of play, the PGA Tour can shorten an event to 54 holes. A 54-hole event is still considered official, with full points and monies awarded. Any tournament stopped before 54 holes can be completed is reverted to the 36-hole score and the win is considered unofficial, notably Adam Scott at the 2005 Nissan Open.

Priority ranking system
The PGA Tour maintains a priority ranking system that is used to select the fields for most tournaments on tour. Below is the 2016–17 ranking system, in order of priority.

 Winner of PGA Championship or U.S. Open prior to 1970 or in the last five seasons and the current season
 Winner of The Players Championship in the last five seasons and the current season
 Winners of the Masters Tournament in the last five seasons and the current season
 Winners of The Open Championship in the last five seasons and the current season
 Winners of the Tour Championship in the last three seasons and the current season
 Winners of World Golf Championships events in the last three seasons and the current season
 Winners of the Arnold Palmer Invitational and the Memorial Tournament in the last three seasons and the current season, beginning with the 2015 winners
 Leader from the final FedExCup Points List in each of the last five seasons
 Leaders from the final PGA Tour Money List prior to 2017 for the subsequent five seasons
 Winners of PGA Tour co-sponsored or approved tournaments, whose victories are considered official, within the last two seasons, or during the current season; winners receive an additional season of exemption for each additional win, up to five seasons
 Career earnings
 A. Players among the top 50 in career earnings as of the end of the preceding season may elect to use a one-time exemption for the next season
 B. Players among the Top 25 in career earnings as of the end of the preceding season may elect to use this special one-time exemption for the next season
 Sponsor exemptions (a maximum of eight, which may include amateurs with handicaps of 0 or less), on the following basis:
 A. Not less than two sponsor invitees shall be PGA Tour members not otherwise exempt.
 B. Not less than two of the 2016 Top Finishers of the Web.com Tour, if not all can otherwise be accommodated.
 Two international players designated by the Commissioner.
 The current PGA Club Professional Champion up to six open events (3 must be opposite The Open Championship and World Golf Championships events), in addition to any sponsor selections. The exemption does not apply to open, limited-field events.
 PGA Section Champion or Player of the Year of the Section in which the tournament is played.
 Four low scorers at Open Qualifying which shall normally be held on Monday of tournament week.
 Past champions of the particular event being contested that week, if cosponsored by the PGA Tour and the same tournament organizer (not title sponsor), as follows:
 A. Winners prior to July 28, 1970: unlimited exemptions for such events.
 B. Winners after Jan. 1, 2000: five seasons of exemptions for such events.
 Life Members (who have been active members of the PGA Tour for 15 years and have won at least 20 co-sponsored events).
 Top 125 on the previous season's FedExCup points list.
 Top 125 on previous season's Official Money List through the Wyndham Championship
 Players who finished greater than or equal to top 125 on the 2015–16 PGA Tour Official Season FedExCup Points List or top 125 on the 2015–16 Official Season Money List through the Wyndham Championship as non-members
 Major Medical Extension: If granted by the Commissioner, if not otherwise eligible, and if needed to fill the field, Special Medical Extension
 Leading Money Winner from the previous season's Top 25 regular season players using combined money earned on the Official Web.com Tour Regular Season Money List and Web.com Tour Finals Money List, Leading Money Winner from the previous season's Web.com Tour Finals and Three-Time Winners from previous season Web.com Tour.
 Leading money winner from Web.com Tour medical
 Top 10 and ties, not otherwise exempt, among professionals from the previous open tournament whose victory has official status are exempt into the next open tournament whose victory has official status.
 Top Finishers of the Web.com Tour
 Top Finishers from the Web.com Tour medical
 Players winning three Web.com Tour events in the current season
 Minor medical extension
 Twenty-five finishers beyond 125th place on prior season's FedExCup Points List (126–150)
 Nonexempt, major medical/family crisis
 The following categories are reordered after the end of calendar year tournament, The Players, and the majors, based on FedEx Cup points the previous season, and then if necessary, career earnings, for players outside 150th on the FedEx Cup points list.
 Past Champions - Players who have won a PGA Tour event.
 Special Temporary Members - Non-members who scored more points than 150th place in the previous year's FedEx Cup points list.
 Team Tournament Winners - Players who have won a team tournament.
 Veteran Members - Players with over 150 cuts made in the PGA Tour. Ordered by money won in career.

Some tournaments deviate from this system; for example, the Phoenix Open has only five sponsor exemptions and three Monday qualifying spots, while invitational tournaments such as the Arnold Palmer Invitational, Memorial Tournament, and Dean & DeLuca Invitational have completely different eligibility categories.

Event categories
Majors The four leading annual events in world golf are the Masters Tournament, U.S. Open, The (British) Open Championship, and the PGA Championship. These events each automatically receive 100 OWGR points.
World Golf Championships (WGC) A set of events co-sanctioned by the International Federation of PGA Tours which attract the leading golfers from all over the world, including those who are not members of the PGA Tour. Note that the HSBC Champions was made a WGC event in the middle of the 2009 season.
Unique Two tournaments rate as unique, for different reasons:
The Sentry Tournament of Champions, the first tournament of the calendar year, has a field consisting of winners from the previous season's competition only. This results in a field much smaller than any other tournament except for The Tour Championship, with no cut after 36 holes of play. 
The Players Championship is the only event, apart from the majors and the World Golf Championships, which attracts entries from almost all of the world's elite golfers. It is the designated OWGR flagship event for the PGA Tour and awards 80 OWGR points to its winner. Only major championships can be awarded more OWGR points. For purposes of the FedEx Cup standings, The Players has had an identical point allocation to that of the majors since the Cup was instituted in 2007. 

Playoff event The final three events of the season (four from 2007 to 2018) are the FedEx Cup playoffs. The top 125 players on the points list are eligible for the first event and the field size decreases to The Tour Championship with 30 players.

Team A United States team of 12 elite players competes in the Ryder Cup and the Presidents Cup in alternate years. The Ryder Cup, pitting a team of U.S. golfers against a European team, is arguably the highest profile event in golf, outranking the majors. The Presidents Cup, which matches a team of U.S. golfers against an international team of golfers not eligible for the Ryder Cup, is less well established, but is still the main event of the week when it is played. There is no prize money in these events, so they are irrelevant to the money list, but an immense amount of pride rides on the results.
Regular Routine weekly tour events. The "regular" events vary somewhat in status, but this is fairly subjective and not usually based on the size of the purse. Some of the factors which can determine the status of a tournament are:
Its position in the schedule, which influences the number of leading players that choose to enter.
Its age and the distinction of its past champions.
The repute of the course on which it is played.
Any associations with "legends of golf". Six events in particular have such associations (four of these are invitational events):
The AT&T Byron Nelson, named after Byron Nelson, was until 2007 the only current event named after a PGA Tour golfer.
The Arnold Palmer Invitational, formerly the Bay Hill Invitational, closely identified with Arnold Palmer and played at a resort he owned.
The Genesis Invitational, identified with Tiger Woods through his foundation as of 2020.
The Charles Schwab Challenge, identified with Ben Hogan.
The Memorial Tournament, founded by Jack Nicklaus, played on a course he designed, and annually honoring a selected "legend".
Invitational These events are similar to the regular ones, but have a slightly smaller field and do not follow the normal PGA Tour exemption categories. Invitational tournaments include the Genesis Invitational, the Charles Schwab Challenge, the Arnold Palmer Invitational, the RBC Heritage, the Memorial Tournament. The tournaments usually have an association with a golf legend, or in the case of the RBC Heritage, a famous course. The table below illustrates some of the notable features of the exemption categories for these events:

Alternate Events which are played in the same week as a higher status tournament (either a WGC or the Open Championship) and therefore have weakened fields and reduced prize money. They are often considered an opportunity for players who would not qualify for certain events due to their world rankings, positions on the FedEx Cup points list, or position on the Tour's priority list to move up more easily or have an easier attempt at a two-year exemption for winning a tournament. Because of their weaker fields, these events usually receive the minimum amount of world ranking points reserved for PGA Tour events (24 points) and fewer FedEx Cup points than most tournaments (300 points instead of 500). Alternate event winners also do not earn Masters invitations. Fields for alternate events have 132 players. These events have 12 unrestricted sponsor exemptions, four more than the regular events.
Fall Series (defunct) Prior to the 2013 season, the PGA Tour included a fall series consisting of those events after the final playoff event of the FedEx Cup season (The Tour Championship) through the end of the calendar year. These events provided extra opportunities for players to retain their cards by finishing within the top 125 of the money list. Since fall 2013 (the 2014 season), the events held in the fall have opened the tour season, and receive full FedEx Cup points allocations and Masters invitations
Challenge Season There are also a number of events which are recognized by the PGA Tour, but which do not count towards the official money list. Most of these take place in the off season (November and December). This slate of unofficial, often made-for-TV events (which have included the PGA Grand Slam of Golf, the Wendy's 3-Tour Challenge, the Franklin Templeton Shootout, the Skins Game, etc.) is referred to as the "Challenge Season" or more commonly as the "Silly Season".

Changes since the 2013 season

On March 20, 2012, the tour announced radical changes to the tour's season and qualifying process. Further details of these changes relating to the Fall Series were announced on June 26, with the remaining details announced on July 10. One of the final details received a minor tweak, effective for the 2013 season only, on September 11.

First, the 2013 season was the last to be conducted entirely within a calendar year. Since the 2014 season, the season starts in October of the previous calendar year, shortly after the Tour Championship. The tournaments in the now season-opening Fall Series are awarded full FedEx Cup points.

As a result of the schedule change, the qualifying school no longer grants playing rights on the PGA Tour, but only privileges on the Korn Ferry Tour.

The criterion for retaining tour cards at the end of the season also changed. Through 2012, the top 125 players on the money list at the end of the PGA Tour season retained their tour cards. For the 2013 season only, the top 125 players on both the money list and the FedEx Cup points list at the end of the FedEx Cup regular season in August retained their cards. The tour also said that it would decide at a later time whether to keep this aspect of the qualifying system in place in future seasons. Otherwise, the planned move by the tour to have the top 125 players on the FedEx Cup points list retain their tour cards took effect with the 2014 season. The next 75 players on the points list, along with the top 75 on the money list of the Korn Ferry Tour at the end of that tour's regular season, are eligible to play a series of three tournaments in September known as the Korn Ferry Tour Finals. The Finals field, however, is not expected to consist of all 150 players, as some of the PGA Tour players will be exempt by other criteria, such as a tournament win in the previous two years. A total of 50 PGA Tour cards for the next season is awarded at the end of the Finals. The 25 leading money winners during the Korn Ferry Tour regular season receive cards, and total money earned during the Finals determines the remaining 25 card earners. For all 50 new card earners, their positions on the PGA Tour's priority order for purposes of tournament are based on money earned in the Finals.  College players who turn professional can enter the series if their earnings are equivalent to a top-200 PGA Tour or top-75 Korn Ferry Tour finish.

In addition, the leading money winners on the Korn Ferry Tour in both the regular season and Finals receive automatic invitations to The Players Championship (note that if a golfer tops both money lists, only one Players invitation is awarded).

Finally, two events held in Asia after the end of the PGA Tour's current regular season – the CIMB Classic in Malaysia and the HSBC Champions, a World Golf Championships event held in China – became full PGA Tour events, with official prize money, for the first time. Before 2013, neither event had full PGA Tour status despite being sanctioned by the Tour. Wins in the CIMB Classic were not classified as official PGA Tour wins, and HSBC Champions victories were official wins only for current PGA Tour members. Money earned in these events did not count as official PGA Tour earnings for any purpose.

Money winners and most wins leaders
Players who lead the money list on the PGA Tour win the Arnold Palmer Award (1981–2018).

Multiple money list titles
The following players have won more than one money list title through 2022:
10: Tiger Woods
8: Jack Nicklaus
5: Ben Hogan, Tom Watson
4: Arnold Palmer
3: Sam Snead, Curtis Strange, Greg Norman, Vijay Singh, Justin Thomas
2: Byron Nelson, Julius Boros, Billy Casper, Tom Kite, Nick Price, Rory McIlroy

Player and rookie of the year awards
PGA Tour players compete for two player of the year awards. The PGA Player of the Year award dates back to 1948 (originally named the PGA Golfer of the Year) and is awarded by the PGA of America. Since 1982 the winner has been selected using a points system with points awarded for wins, money list position and scoring average. The PGA Tour Player of the Year award, also known as the Jack Nicklaus Trophy, is administered by the PGA Tour and was introduced in 1990; the recipient is selected by the tour players by ballot, although the results are not released other than to say who has won. More often than not the same player wins both awards; in fact, as seen in the table below, the PGA and PGA Tour Players of the Year have been the same every year from 1992 through 2018.

The Rookie of the Year award was also introduced in 1990. Players are eligible in their first season of PGA Tour membership if they competed in less than seven events from any prior season. Several of the winners had a good deal of international success before their PGA Tour rookie season, and some have been in their thirties when they won the award. In March 2012, a new award, the PGA Tour Courage Award, was introduced in replacement of the defunct Comeback Player of the Year award.

Note: No award was presented in 1968 due to the rift between the PGA of America and the professional golfers on the PGA tour.

Multiple Player of the Year Awards
The following players have won more than one PGA Player of the Year Award through 2022:
11: Tiger Woods
6: Tom Watson
5: Jack Nicklaus
4: Ben Hogan
2: Julius Boros, Billy Casper, Brooks Koepka, Rory McIlroy, Arnold Palmer, Nick Price, Justin Thomas

The following players have won more than one PGA Tour Player of the Year Award through 2022 (first awarded in 1990):
11: Tiger Woods
3: Rory McIlroy
2: Fred Couples, Dustin Johnson, Nick Price

Career money leaders
The top ten career money leaders on the tour as of the 2021–22 season, are as follows:

A complete list updated weekly is available on the PGA Tour's website.

Due to increases in prize funds over the years, this list consists entirely of current players. The figures are not the players' complete career prize money as they do not include FedEx Cup bonuses, winnings from unofficial money events, or earnings on other tours such as the European Tour. In addition, elite golfers often earn several times as much from endorsements and golf-related business interests as they do from prize money.

Commissioners

See also

Golf in the United States
Professional golf tours
List of golfers with most PGA Tour wins
List of golfers with most wins in one PGA Tour event
Most PGA Tour wins in a year
Vardon Trophy

Notes

References

External links
 

 
Sports organizations established in 1968
1968 establishments in New York (state)
Organizations based in Florida